The following have served as president of Kent State University:

 John Edward McGilvrey (1911–1926); (b. 1867, d. 1945)
 David Allen Anderson (1926–1928); (b. 1874)
 James Ozro Engleman (1928–1938); (b. 1873, d. 1943)
 Karl Clayton Leebrick (1938–1943); (b. 1885, d. 1982)
 George A. Bowman (1944–1963); (b. 1893, d. 1976)
 Robert I. White (1963–1971); (b. 1909, d. 1990)
 Glenn A. Olds (1971–1977); (b. 1921, d. 2006)
 Brage Golding (1977–1982); (b. 1920, d. 2016)
 Michael Schwartz (1982–1991); (b. 1938)
 Carol Cartwright (1991–July 2006); (b. 1941)
 Lester Lefton (July 2006–July 2014); (b. 1942)
 Beverly J. Warren (July 2014–July 2019)
 Todd Diacon (July 2019–)

See also
List of Kent State University alumni

References

External links
List of presidents on Kent State website

 
Kent State